François-Georges Fouques Deshayes (1733, Caen - 25 November 1825), known as Desfontaines or Desfontaines-Lavallée, was a French writer and playwright.

Before the French Revolution he worked as a royal censor, secretary and librarian.  He cooperated in the publication of the Nouvelle Bibliothèque des romans (New Library of Novels) and wrote several novels himself, including Lettres de Sophie et du chevalier de *** (1765).

He was one of the founders of the Dîners du Vaudeville and of the Dîners du Caveau. He died in Paris.

Works 
Theatre
1765: La Bergère des Alpes, comedy in 1 act and in free vers, Hôtel de Bourgogne, 15 December
1767: L'Aveugle de Palmyre, comédie pastorale in 2 acts in verse mingled with ariettes, Hôtel de Bourgogne, 5 March Read online
1771: La Cinquantaine, pastorale in 3 acts, music by Laborde, Théâtre du Palais-Royal, 13 Août Read online
1773: Isménor, heroic drama in 3 acts, music by Rodolphe, Château de Versailles, 17 November
1776: Le Mai, comedy in 3 acts, mingled with verse and prose, ariettes and vaudevilles and ending with a ballet, Hôtel de Bourgogne, 8 May
1778: La Chasse, comedy in 3 acts and in prose, mingled with ariettes, Hôtel de Bourgogne, 12 October
1781: L'Amant statue, opéra comique in vaudevilles in 1 act, Hôtel de Bourgogne, 20 February
1781: Isabelle hussard, parade in 1 act and in vaudevilles, Hôtel de Bourgogne, 31 July
1782: L'Amour et la Folie, opera comique in 3 acts, in vaudevilles and in prose, Hôtel de Bourgogne, 5 March
1783: Les Trois inconnues, comedy in 3 acts and in verse mingled with ariettes, Château de Versailles, 7 February
1783: Le Réveil de Thalie, comedy in 3 acts, Comédie Italienne, 6 May
1783: La Dot, comedy in 3 acts and in prose, Hôtel de Bourgogne, 8 November
1784: Les Amours de Chérubin, comedy in 3 acts and in prose, mingled with music and vaudevilles, Hôtel de Bourgogne, 4 November
1785: L'Amant statue, comedy in 1 act and in prose mingled with ariettes, with music by Nicolas Dalayrac, salle Favart, created 4 August 
1785: La Dot, comedy in 3 acts and in prose mingled with ariettes, music by Nicolas Dalayrac, salle Favart, created 8 November at the Cour in Fontainebleau then given 21 November  
1786: L'Incendie du Havre, historical fact in one act, prose and vaudevilles, Hôtel de Bourgogne, 21 February
1788: Fanchette ou l'Heureuse Épreuve, comedy in 3 acts and in prose mingled with ariettes, music by Nicolas Dalayrac, salle Favart, 13 October
1790: Le District de village, ambigu in 1 act, Hôtel de Bourgogne, 15 March Read online
1790: Vert-Vert, divertissement in 1 act, music by Nicolas Dalayrac, salle Favart, created 11 October 
1792: Les Mille et un théâtres, opera comique in 1 act and in vaudevilles, Théâtre du Vaudeville, 14 February
1792: Arlequin afficheur, comédie-parade in 1 act, in prose mingled with vaudeville, with Pierre-Yves Barré and Jean-Baptiste Radet, Théâtre du Vaudeville, 9 April
1792: Le Projet manqué, ou Arlequin taquin, parody of Lucretius, in 1 act, in prose and in vaudevilles, with Pierre-Yves Barré and Jean-Baptiste Radet, Théâtre du Vaudeville, 18 May
1792: Arlequin Cruello, parody of Othello by Jean-François Ducis, in 2 acts and in prose, mingled with vaudevilles, with Pierre-Yves Barré and Jean-Baptiste Radet, Théâtre du Vaudeville, 13 December
1793: La Chaste Suzanne, play in 2 acts, with Pierre-Yves Barré and Jean-Baptiste Radet, Palais de l'Égalité, 5 January 
1793: Colombine mannequin, comédie-parade in 1 act, in prose, mingled with vaudevilles, with Pierre-Yves Barré and Jean-Baptiste Radet, Théâtre du Vaudeville, 15 February
1793: Le Divorce, comedy in 1 act and in vaudeville, Théâtre du Vaudeville, 18 May Read online
1793: Au retour, historic and patriotic fact in 1 act and in vaudevilles, with Jean-Baptiste Radet, Théâtre du Vaudeville, 4 November
1794: La Fête de l'égalité, comedy in 1 act, with Jean-Baptiste Radet, Théâtre du Vaudeville, 25 February Read online
1794: Les Vieux époux, comedy in 1 act, mingled with vaudevilles, Théâtre du Vaudeville, 24 March
1796: Encore un curé, historic and patriotic fact in 1 act and in vaudevilles, with Jean-Baptiste Radet, Théâtre du Vaudeville, 20 November Read online
1794: Les Chouans de Vitré, historical fact in 1 act, in prose, Théâtre du Vaudeville, 12 June
1794: La Fille soldat, historical fact in 1 act and vaudevilles, Théâtre du Vaudeville, 13 December
1795: Abuzar, ou La Famille extravagante, parody of Abufar, ou la Famille arabe, in 1 act and in vaudevilles, with Pierre-Yves Barré and Jean-Baptiste Radet, Théâtre du Vaudeville, 15 May Read online
1797: Le Mariage de Scarron, comedy in 1 act and in prose, mingled with vaudevilles, with Pierre-Yves Barré and Jean-Baptiste Radet, Théâtre du Vaudeville, 8 May
1797: Le Pari, divertissement in 1 act, in prose and vaudevilles, on the occasion of peace, with Pierre-Yves Barré, Jean-Baptiste Radet, Jacques-Marie Deschamps and Jean-Baptiste-Denis Desprès, Théâtre du Vaudeville, 28 October Read online
1798: Jean-Jacques Rousseau dans son ermitage, ou la Vallée de Montmorency, comédie en vaudeville in 3 acts, with Pierre-Yves Barré, Jean-Baptiste Radet and Pierre-Antoine-Augustin de Piis, Théâtre du Vaudeville, 1 June
1798: Hommage du petit Vaudeville au grand Racine, comédie en vaudeville in 1 act, with Pierre-Yves Barré, Jean-Baptiste Radet, André-François de Coupigny and Pierre-Antoine-Augustin de Piis, Théâtre du Vaudeville, 21 May
1799: Voltaire, ou Une journée de Ferney, comedy in 2 acts, mingled with vaudevilles, with Pierre-Yves Barré, Jean-Baptiste Radet, André-François de Coupigny and Pierre-Antoine-Augustin de Piis, Théâtre du Vaudeville, 19 February
1799: Monet directeur de l'Opéra-comique, comedy in 1 act and in vaudevilles, with Pierre-Yves Barré and Jean-Baptiste Radet, Théâtre du Vaudeville, 22 July
1799: La Girouette de Saint-Cloud, impromptu in 1 act, in prose, mingled with vaudevilles, with Pierre-Yves Barré, Jean-Baptiste Radet, Emmanuel Dupaty and Bourgueil, Théâtre du Vaudeville, 14 November
1799: Cendrillon, ou l'École des mères, comedy in 2 acts, Théâtre du Vaudeville
1800: M. Guillaume, ou le Voyageur inconnu, comedy in 1 act and in prose mingled with vaudevilles, with Pierre-Yves Barré, Jean-Baptiste Radet and Bourgueil, Théâtre du Vaudeville, 1 February
1800: Gessner, comedy in 2 acts and in prose, mingled with vaudevilles, with Pierre-Yves Barré, Jean-Baptiste Radet and Bourgueil, Théâtre du Vaudeville, 31 May
1800: La Récréation du monde, suite de la Création, melodrama, music by Joseph Haydn, mingled with vaudevilles, with Pierre-Yves Barré and Jean-Baptiste Radet, Théâtre du Vaudeville, 29 December
1801: Enfin nous y voilà, divertissement in 1 act, with Pierre-Yves Barré and Jean-Baptiste Radet, Théâtre du Vaudeville, 18 February
1802: La Tragédie au Vaudeville, in 1 act and in prose, mingled with couplets, followed by Après la confession, la pénitence, petit épilogue à l'occasion d'un grand prologue, with Pierre-Yves Barré and Jean-Baptiste Radet, Théâtre du Vaudeville, 18 March
1803: Cassandre-Agamemnon et Colombine-Cassandre, parody of Agamemnon, in 1 act, in prose, mingled with vaudevilles, with Pierre-Yves Barré, Jean-Baptiste Radet and Armand Gouffé, Théâtre du Vaudeville, 2 December
1803: Chapelain, ou la Ligue des auteurs contre Boileau, comédie en vaudeville in 1 act and in prose, with Pierre-Yves Barré and Jean-Baptiste Radet, Théâtre du Vaudeville, 23 December
1804: La Tapisserie de la reine Mathilde, comedy in 1 act, in prose, mingled with vaudevilles, with Pierre-Yves Barré and Jean-Baptiste Radet, Théâtre du Vaudeville, 14 January
1804: Duguay-Trouin, prisonnier à Plymouth, historical fact in 2 acts, with Pierre-Yves Barré, Jean-Baptiste Radet and Saint-Félix, Théâtre du Vaudeville, 14 April
1804: Bertrand Duguesclin et sa sœur, comedy in 2 acts and in prose mingled with vaudevilles, with Pierre-Yves Barré and Jean-Baptiste Radet, Théâtre du Vaudeville, 27 November
1805: Sophie Arnould, comedy in 3 acts and in prose, mingled with vaudevilles, with Pierre-Yves Barré and Jean-Baptiste Radet, Théâtre du Vaudeville, January
1805: Le Vaudeville au camp de Boulogne, prologue impromptu, with Pierre-Yves Barré and Jean-Baptiste Radet, Boulogne-sur-Mer, 17 August
1805: Les Écriteaux, ou René Le Sage à la foire Saint-Germain, pièce anecdotique in 2 acts and in prose, mingled with vaudevilles, with Pierre-Yves Barré and Jean-Baptiste Radet, Théâtre du Vaudeville, December
1806: Les Deux n'en font qu'un, comedy in 1 act and in prose, mingled with vaudevilles, followed by a divertissement on the occasion of peace, with Pierre-Yves Barré and Jean-Baptiste Radet, Théâtre du Vaudeville, 31 January
1806: Omazette, ou Jozet en Champagne, parody of Omasis, ou Joseph en Égypte, comédie en vaudeville in 1 act, with Pierre-Yves Barré and Jean-Baptiste Radet, Théâtre du Vaudeville, 6 October
1806 Le Rêve, ou la Colonne de Rosback, divertissement de circonstance, in prose and vaudevilles, with Pierre-Yves Barré and Jean-Baptiste Radet, Théâtre du Vaudeville, 15 November
1807: Le Château et la Chaumière, ou les Arts et la reconnaissance, comedy in 3 acts, Théâtre du Vaudeville, 22 January
1807: L'Ile de la Mégalantropogénésie, ou les Savants de naissance, comédie en vaudeville in 1 act, with Pierre-Yves Barré, Jean-Baptiste Radet and Michel Dieulafoy, Théâtre du Vaudeville, 26 May
1807: L'Hôtel de la Paix, rue de la Victoire, à Paris, comédie en vaudeville in 1 act, with Pierre-Yves Barré, Jean-Baptiste Radet and Michel Dieulafoy, Théâtre du Vaudeville, 3 July
1808: Le Voyage de Chambord, ou la Veille de la première représentation du Bourgeois gentilhomme, comedy in 1 act, mingled with vaudevilles, with Henri Dupin, Théâtre du Vaudeville, 11 July
1809: Le Peintre français en Espagne, ou le Dernier soupir de l'Inquisition, comédie en vaudeville in 1 act, with Pierre-Yves Barré and Jean-Baptiste Radet, Théâtre du Vaudeville, 11 March
1809: Lantara, ou le Peintre au cabaret, comédie en vaudeville in 1 act, with Pierre-Yves Barré, Jean-Baptiste Radet and Louis Picard, Théâtre du Vaudeville, 2 October Read online
1810: M. Durelief, ou Petite revue des embellissements de Paris, in prose and in vaudevilles, with Pierre-Yves Barré and Jean-Baptiste Radet, Théâtre du Vaudeville, 9 June
1810: Les Deux Lions, vaudeville in 1 act, with Pierre-Yves Barré, Jean-Baptiste Radet and Louis-Benoît Picard, Théâtre du Vaudeville, 2 Octobre
1811: La Nouvelle télégraphique, comédie en vaudeville in 1 act, with Pierre-Yves Barré and Jean-Baptiste Radet, Théâtre du Vaudeville, 21 March
1811: Les Deux Edmond, comedy in 2 acts and in prose, with Pierre-Yves Barré and Jean-Baptiste Radet, Théâtre du Vaudeville, 18 April
1811: Laujon de retour à l'ancien Caveau, comédie en vaudeville in 1 act, par les convives du Caveau moderne, with Pierre-Yves Barré and Jean-Baptiste Radet, Théâtre du Vaudeville, 2 December
1811: Les Amazones et les Scythes, ou Sauter le fossé, comédie en deux actes, avec Pierre-Yves Barré et Jean-Baptiste Radet, Paris, Théâtre du Vaudeville, 19 December
1812: Les Limites, comedy in 1 act, mingled with vaudevilles, with Pierre-Yves Barré and Jean-Baptiste Radet, Théâtre du Vaudeville, 19 September
1812: Gaspard l'avisé, comédie anecdotique in 1 act, in prose and vaudevilles, with Pierre-Yves Barré and Jean-Baptiste Radet, Théâtre du Vaudeville, 27 October
1813: Le Billet trouvé, comédie en vaudeville in 1 act, with Pierre-Yves Barré and Jean-Baptiste Radet, Théâtre des Variétés, 3 May
1814: Un Petit voyage du Vaudeville, divertissement in 1 act, for the return of peace, with Pierre-Yves Barré and Jean-Baptiste Radet, Théâtre du Vaudeville, 5 May
1815: Les Trois Saphos lyonnaises, ou Une vour d'amour, comédie en vaudeville in 2 acts, with Pierre-Yves Barré and Jean-Baptiste Radet, Théâtre du Vaudeville, 14 January
Varia
1765: Lettres de Sophie et du chevalier de **, pour servir de supplément aux lettres du marquis de Roselle, 2 vol.
1779–1781 Histoire universelle des théâtres de toutes les nations, depuis Thespis jusqu'à nos jours, with Jean-Marie-Louis Coupé, Testu and Le Fuel de Méricourt, 13 vol.
1785: Les Quatre Saisons littéraires, 2 vol. Text online : Le Printemps Text online : L'Été

 Sources 
 Gustave Vapereau, Dictionnaire universel des littératures'', Paris, Hachette, 1876, p. 615-6

External links 
 His plays and their productions on CESAR

1733 births
1825 deaths
Writers from Caen
18th-century French dramatists and playwrights
19th-century French dramatists and playwrights
18th-century French novelists
19th-century French novelists